Maria Tudor is an opera in four acts composed by Antônio Carlos Gomes to an Italian-language libretto by Emilio Praga (completed by Arrigo Boito). The libretto is based on Victor Hugo's 1833 play Marie Tudor, which centers on the rise, fall and execution of Fabiano Fabiani, a fictional favourite of Mary I of England. The opera premiered on 27 March 1879 at La Scala, Milan, with Anna D'Angeri in the title role and Francesco Tamagno as Fabiani. The opera was a failure at its premiere and withdrawn, a heavy blow to Gomes who was in serious financial and family difficulties at the time. He returned to his native Brazil the following year.

Maria Tudor was revived in November 1998 at the Bulgarian National Opera in Sofia with Eliane Coelho in the title role. The performance was televised and a live recording released on CD by the Brazilian label ImagemData.

References

External links
Complete libretto, published by Ricordi for the La Scala premiere in 1879
Complete piano/vocal score, published by Ricordi in 1878

Operas by Carlos Gomes
Italian-language operas
1879 operas
Operas based on plays
Operas set in Italy
Opera world premieres at La Scala
Operas